Connor Price (born November 11, 1994) is a Canadian-American actor and hip hop artist. Beginning his career as a child actor, he is best known for his roles in the films Cinderella Man (2005) and Good Luck Chuck (2007).

Career 
Price's career began at the age of six. His first notable role was of Jay Braddock, the eldest son of Russell Crowe and Renée Zellweger in the Ron Howard Academy Award Nominated feature Cinderella Man. He is best known for portraying Kenny, the leader of the Boston vampire clan for two seasons of Syfy's Being Human and the role of Harry James in three seasons of CBC's World War II spy Drama X Company.

Personal life 

Price holds dual citizenship in the US and Canada. He has four siblings (Kaitlyn, Brendan, Ryan and Thomas), all of them actors.

Filmography

Television

Discography

Albums 
 Spin The Globe (2023)

EPs 
 4 of Clubs (2018)
 Trillium (2022)

Singles 
 "'S' [Part 1]" (2017)
 "UP" (2018)
 "Group Chat" (prod. MrDeeJayK) (2018)
 "The Basics" (2019)
 "When You're Gone" feat. Brea Price (2019)
 "No Visits" (2020) 
 "Eastern Ave Night Drive" (2020)
 "Love Language" feat. Evelyne Brochu (2020)
 "You" (2020)
 "The Usual" feat. ShaqlsDope (2020)
 "Midsummer Freestyle" (2020)
 "The Birds" (2020)
 "Happy Alone" (2021)
 "Courteney Cox" feat. Idris Elba (2021)
 "Imposter Syndrome" (2021)
 "Toast" (2021)
 "21 Raps" (2021)
 "You Said" (2021)
 "Receipts" feat. Matty Beats, Lex Bratcher (2021)
 "Love Language (Acoustic)" feat. Evelyne Brochu (2021)
 "EGOT" (2021)
 "Talk About Us" feat. Chloe Sagum (2021)
 "Roots" (2021)
 "Marathon" feat. 4Korners (2021)
 "Don't Tell Me" feat. John Roa (2021)
 "Christmas in Vegas" (2021)
 "Happy Face" (2022)
 "City Lights" (2022)
 "Nobodies" feat. Nic D (2022)
 "Smooth" (2022)
 "SPLAT" (2022)
 "Gasoline" feat. Nic D (2022)
 "Jude's Song" (2022)
 "Start Again" feat. Chloe Sagum (2022)
 "Easy" feat. Nic D (2022)
 "These Days" (2022)
 "Grateful" feat. callmestevieray (2022)
 "Aces" feat. 4Korners, Akintoye, Idris Elba (2022)
 "Straight A's" (2022)
 "Selfish" feat. Nic D (2022)
 "Bankroll" feat. Nic D (2022)
 "Chatter" (2022)
 "Buddy" feat. Hoodie Allen (2022)
 "Chirp" feat. Hoodie Allen (2023)
 "Drop" feat. Zensory (2023)
 "Swing" feat. Nic D, 4Korners (2023)
 "Not A Beanie" feat. bbno$ (2023)

Remix appearances 
 "Flava in ya Ear (Remix)" (2017)
 "ICON (Remix)" (2018)
 "Sicko Mode (Remix)" (2018)
 "Drip Too Hard (Remix)" (2019)
 "Nobody Knows (Remix)" (feat. Chloe Sagum) (2019)
 "Whats Poppin (Remix)" (2020)
 Drake - "Over the Top (Remix)" (2021)
 Polo G - "Party Lyfe (Remix)" (2021)
 Logic - "Vaccine (Remix)" (2021)
 G-Eazy - "Origami (Remix)" (2021)
 Cordae - "Super (Remix)" (2021)
 bbno$ - "Edamame (Remix)" (2021)
 Trippie Redd - "Can You Rap Like Me? (Remix)" (2021)

References

External links 

https://open.spotify.com/artist/5zixe6AbgXPqt4c1uSl94L?si=jFDINHQBRz-gUpZnGrmu2Q

Canadian male child actors
Canadian male film actors
Canadian male rappers
Canadian male television actors
Canadian male voice actors
21st-century Canadian male actors
Living people
Male actors from Ontario
1994 births